Pierre Edouard Van Humbeeck (Brussels, 17 May 1829-Brussels, 5 July 1890) was a Belgian lawyer and liberal politician. He was a member of the city council of Brussels, the Belgian parliament and minister.

He was the first Belgian minister of education.

See also
 Liberal Party

Sources
 Liberal Archive

1829 births
1890 deaths
Belgian politicians